Michel Forget (born February 27, 1942 in Montreal, Quebec) is a Quebec actor.

Background
Forget had a long acting career in which he participated in several films and television series which were popular among French Canadians.

In 1986, Michel Forget drove a boat from Paris to Montreal. It took him more than 72 hours.

His first role was in 1973 in Des armes et les hommes and he has played in a total of 57 movies or television series in his career. Among his most notable roles was the long-lived series Lance et Compte in which he played the role of Gilles Guilbault, the general manager of the Quebec National,  a fictional NHL team inspired by the Quebec Nordiques (now Colorado Avalanche).

He also played in several popular television series such as Duplessis (1977), The Mills of Power (Les Tisserands du pouvoir, 1988), Super Sans Plomb (1989), Les Machos (1995) and Maurice Richard: Histoire d'un Canadien (1999).

Forget played supporting roles in a few films including Aurore in which he played the role of Nérée Caron, Aurore's maternal grandfather.

External links
 

1942 births
Living people
Male actors from Montreal
Canadian male film actors
Canadian male television actors
French Quebecers